Johnson Health Tech. Co., Ltd. (JHT) is a multinational company engaged in the manufacturing and sale of exercise equipment. It is headquartered in Taichung, Taiwan. JHT's products include treadmills, stationary bicycles, elliptical trainers, weight training machines etc. The company has manufacturing plants in Shanghai and Taiwan, and R&D centers in Shanghai, Taiwan, and North America. It is the winner of two Taiwan Excellence Awards.

Brands
The brands owned by Johnson Health Tech are:

Johnson Fitness & Wellness: A Cottage Grove, Wisconsin-based personal fitness and wellness retailer that sells treadmills, ellipticals, exercise bikes, home gyms and accessories.
Horizon Fitness: A Cottage Grove, Wisconsin-based company that manufactures treadmills, stationary bicycles, elliptical trainers for domestic use.
Advanced Fitness Groups (AFG): Also a Cottage Grove, Wisconsin-based subsidiary that acts as a semi-exclusive name brand for Sears (in the United States) and Canadian Tire (in Canada)
Matrix Fitness: A company that manufactures exercise equipment for commercial use. 
Vision Fitness: A company that manufactures exercise equipment for domestic and commercial use.

JHT is present in the Indian market through contracts with Snap and Gold's Gym. In June 2010, it expanded its presence in the India by making a three-year contract with Talwalkars regarding the supply of gym equipments. Before June 2010, JHT's annual sale in India was 2 million USD. As of 2009, 7.5% of JHT's global revenue, amounting 23 million USD, comes from the Chinese market.

Controversy
In August 2015, Johnson Health Tech was fined $3 million by the United States Consumer Product Safety Commission for failing to report defects in its Matrix Fitness Ascent and Elliptical trainers.  The commission was not notified promptly of multiple reports of smoking, fires, and melted power components.  Johnson Health Tech agreed to pay the fine but did not admit to the charges.

See also 

 Kettler
 Kaatsu
 Vacuactivus

References

External links

1975 establishments in Taiwan
Health care companies of Taiwan
Companies based in Taichung
Exercise equipment companies